Belle Vue Stadium was a greyhound racing track in Belle Vue, Manchester, England, where the first race around an oval track in Britain was held on 24 July 1926. It has also been used for motorcycle speedway, as the home ground of Elite League team Belle Vue Aces from 1988 until 2015, and from 1999 until 2019 for stock car racing and banger racing.

The track was owned (1926–2014) and operated (1926–2019) by the Greyhound Racing Association. The Crown Oil Pension Fund bought the stadium in 2014. The stadium had luxury glass-fronted grandstands, restaurants, hospitality boxes and bars. Greyhound racing took place during three evenings including Saturday and some afternoons on the Bookmakers Afternoon Greyhound Service (BAGS).

Speedway 

Speedway was first held at the stadium during 1928 but was not held again until 1 April 1988, when the Belle Vue Aces returned to the stadium. The team departed Kirkmanshulme Lane at the end of the 2015 season, prior to moving to the new National Speedway Stadium for the 2016 campaign.

Greyhound racing

Origins 
In 1925, Charles A. Munn, an American businessman, made a deal with Smith and Sawyer for the rights to promote the greyhound racing in Britain. Although the earlier attempt to introduce mechanical racing at Hendon had almost been forgotten, the pastime of coursing was still strong in Britain. The first person Munn contacted was Major L. Lyne Dixson. The Major was a leading figure in British field sports and was quickly won over to the idea presented to him by the American entrepreneur.

Finding other supporters proved to rather difficult however. With the General Strike of 1926 looming, the two men scoured the country in an attempt to find others who would join them. Eventually they met Brigadier-General Alfred Critchley, who in turn introduced them to Sir William Gentle JP. Between them they raised £22,000 and formed the Greyhound Racing Association Ltd. When deciding where to situate their new stadium, Manchester was considered to be the ideal place because of its sporting and gambling links. Close to the city centre, the consortium erected the first custom-built greyhound stadium and called it Belle Vue. The name of the stadium came from the nearby Belle Vue Zoological Gardens that had been built in 1836 and the land on which the stadium was to stand had been an area of farmland known as Higher Catsknowl and Lower Catsknowl.

Opening 

The very first race around an oval track in Britain was held on 24 July 1926. More than 1,700 people were attracted to the meeting where they watched a greyhound called Mistley win over 440 yards (402 m).

Six races with seven dogs in each race were held in the first meeting. Fifty years later a stand was named after Mistley, the winner of the first race at 6-1 from trap one. Running the quarter-mile flat course in 25 seconds, Mistley romped home eight lengths clear at 6–1.

The first Director of racing was Major-General T Anderson and the first Racing Manager was L.V.Browne. Trainers included Tom Fear, Bill Brinkley & Jack Harvey. After the end of that first meeting, the GRA were horrified to find they had made a loss of £50 but as it turned out they clearly had made a good decision because 16,000 turned up the following week. The first three-month racing season saw more than 11,000 racegoers, 37 meetings and 221 races The consortium repaid a £10,000 bank loan and shares in the new company rose from their initial value of one shilling to £37–10–00 (the equivalent of £37.50 for an outlay of 5p).

Going to the dogs became a national pastime and the GRA became a substantial company.

Pre-War
By June 1927, the stadium was attracting almost 70,000 visitors a week. Belle Vue increased the number of runners per race to seven, but after the formation of the National Greyhound Racing Club (NGRC) in 1928 the maximum number of dogs per race was limited to six. The phenomenal success resulted in an almost instant and dramatic mass build of greyhound stadiums. One early supplier of greyhounds to Belle Vue was Sidney Orton, a Norfolk farmer who sold 17 greyhounds to Belle Vue for £170 in 1927. Orton would eventually turn his attention to training them at Burhill kennels for Wimbledon Stadium. In 1927, Bonzo, handled by Belle Vue trainer Harry Buck, was the first winner of the Grand National, known as the Champion Hurdle at the time. In 1930, Belle Vue had an English Greyhound Derby finalist when Dresden trained by Eddie Wright finished fourth to none other than Mick the Miller.

Belle Vue introduced the Northern Flat as their first major event in 1927. In 1930, as the sport continued as the nation's leading pastime, the GRA acquired the nearby White City track in the Old Trafford area from Canine Sports Ltd. The first major Belle Vue hound was Wild Woolley; the brindle dog had won the Derby with Jack Rimmer in 1932 but switched kennels to join Jimmy Campbell. Belle Vue had 320 heated kennels housing both track's greyhounds and Wild Woolley won the Northern Flat in a world record time and the Laurels the following year before returning to Rimmer.

In 1936, Banksell won the Edinburgh Cup for John Dickenson and Genial Radiance claimed the Oaks for A.G.Hiscock. The Northern 700 was set up as a new race in 1937 joining the Northern Flat as prominent events. It was in 1937 that GRA purchased the land on which the stadium sat bringing the whole operation into their hands. Crowds continued to flock to the race meetings even as war broke out and racing was restricted to daytimes or summer. Billy Butlin sat on the board of directors in 1947.

1950s
In 1957, Cyril Beamount's Ballypatrick took the Scottish Greyhound Derby title and during June 1964 Belle Vue won the Greyhound Derby for the first time, Hack Up Chieftain trained by Percy Stagg and owned by S.Donohue had won a minor open at Belle Vue when watched by Brigadier General Critchley a GRA Director. Critchley suggested that the greyhound be offered the 48th and last place in that year's event. Mr W S Mulley became Racing Manager in the early fifties and would eventually be replaced by Arthur Aldridge in 1959 who in turn left to be replaced by Norman Russell in the early sixties. The track was chosen by the NGRC to host the BBC Television Trophy four times from 1961 to 1982. Randy Singleton gained a trainer position taking over from Ralph Hencher in 1959.

1960s

In 1961, the GRA introduced under track heating systems at Belle Vue, Harringay and White City following a successful trial in Scotland. Electric cables were basically sewn into the track by the tractor and a team of workers about eight inches under the turf. They would prove to be useful until the advent of all sand tracks. In 1971 Hall Green Racing Manager Sid Wood moved to Belle Vue and Bob Rowe (son of Leicester Racing Manager John Rowe) filled the position at Hall Green. This was the same year that the GRA experimented with eight dog racing. In fact the Northern Flat took place as an eight dog competition, the first major event to do so.

1970s
The 1970s started well when Stan Mitchell was named Greyhound Trainer of the Year. Following the closure of West Ham in 1972, the classic race known as the Cesarewitch was transferred to sister track Belle Vue and GRA Director of Racing Major Percy Brown retired after 40 years in the sport. It was in the seventies that Belle Vue underwent a £500,000 facelift, the previously mentioned Mistley stand was built and the track was able to offer a state of the art restaurant and tote facilities. The popular side stand was also renamed the Chieftain stand after their Derby champion.

During the Silver Jubilee year of 1977 Balliniska Band trained by Eddie Moore claimed a second Greyhound Derby crown for Belle Vue and owner Raphael Bacci. Norman Porter was the Racing Manager at Belle Vue in 1983 when the White City track in Manchester closed its doors. Consequently, the Cock O’the North race was switched to Belle Vue but the Manchester Cup, a former Belle Vue event was scrapped.

1980s
Ian Travis became Racing Manager in 1987 and the Cesarewitch was moved to sister track Catford Stadium.

1990s
In 1995 but the Laurels arrived from Wimbledon in 1997.

2000-present
In 2004, the Gold Collar was hosted by the track following the closure of Catford and a few years later the original classic race the Scurry Gold Cup was brought to the track in an attempt to save the classic race. The Gold Collar and Gorton Cup were discontinued. In 2018, the Oaks was given to Towcester following the decision by GRA to reduce their major race schedule. During the same year the stadium signed a deal with ARC to race every Wednesday afternoon and Sunday morning.

Sale and closure
In 2014, the National Asset Management Agency (who was the parent company of the GRA at the time) sold Belle Vue Stadium for £2.6 million to Crown Oil Pension Fund, but agreed a leaseback to the GRA Acquisition until 2028 at a rent of £249,000 per year. Mutual break options were included in the 15 year tenancy agreement. A similar lease back agreement was agreed in the sale of the Hall Green Stadium with a break clause after five years which was exercised and Hall Green closed in July 2017.

In October 2019 GRA Acquisition sold the lease to the Arena Racing Company and just two months later on 19 December housing planning permission was passed resulting in a probable closure in 2020. The imminent closure came following an announcement on 1 August 2020, with the last race being run on 6 June, won by Rockmount Buster (trained by Gary Griffiths). The closure was accelerated by the COVID-19 pandemic because the stadium initially closed because of the virus and then the planned re-opening only lasted one race meeting.

Competitions

Scurry Gold Cup

Northern Flat

Laurels

Cesarewitch

Oaks

Gold Collar

Cock o' the North

Manchester Cup

Gorton Cup

Northern Stayers Stakes
Formerly the Northern 700

1937-74 (700 yards), 1975–90 (647 metres)

Track records

Final

Previous
Post-metric

Pre-metric

Protests
In 2008, the Sunday Times revealed that Belle Vue greyhounds had been sent for research at Liverpool Veterinary School by Charles Pickering. The Greyhound Board of Great Britain Disciplinary Committee found Pickering in breach of nine rules of racing and ordered that he be made a Warned Off person and fined the sum of £5,000. An incident during 2010 raised concerns over injury rates at Belle Vue. As of 2017 all injury data was made publicly available and independently verified. A 2012 article by the Sunday Express alleged that the kennels of two trainers were kept in unacceptable conditions and highlighted welfare issues. In 2018 licensing and inspecting trainer's kennels was changed and to be conducted through the government-approved, UKAS accredited method.

See also
1926 UK & Ireland Greyhound Racing Year

References

External links
Belle Vue Dogs
Official Belle Vue Website
Belle Vue Owners Forum
Belle Vue Aces Fans Site

Sports venues completed in 1926
Defunct greyhound racing venues in the United Kingdom
Defunct speedway venues in England
Defunct sports venues in Manchester
History of sport in Manchester
2020 disestablishments in England
1926 establishments in England